Carrisi may refer to:

 Albano Carrisi, Italian recording artist, actor, and winemaker
 Donato Carrisi,  Italian writer and screenwriter
 Ylenia Carrisi, the eldest daughter of Italian singers and actors Albano Carrisi and Romina